SRCS may refer to:
San Rafael City Schools
Santa Rosa Consolidated Schools
Standing Rock Community School, in association with Fort Yates School District